Blasius Kleiner was a Franciscan monk who wrote the History of Bulgaria one year before Istoriya Slavyanobolgarskaya. It is not clear when and where he was born, but he died in 1785. He lived in Alvinz (Vințu de Jos).

In his motives for this historical work, as a non-Bulgarian /Transylvanian Saxon/ he points out that it was mainly Greeks who often experienced the power of Bulgarians who spoke about Bulgarian affairs little and accidentally and often concealed the truth. The other one he is famous for is the legend of Bucur (legendary shepherd).

References

Historians of Bulgaria
Transylvanian Saxon people
Romanian Roman Catholic priests
18th-century Roman Catholic priests